Bechir Hadidane (born August 18, 1984) is a Tunisian basketball player for US Monastir and the Tunisian national team.

He participated at the AfroBasket 2017.

References

External links

1984 births
Living people
US Monastir basketball players
Tunisian men's basketball players
People from Nabeul
Centers (basketball)